Byron Fidetzis is a Greek cellist and conductor, who has been a major figure for decades in the musical life of his native Greece. He has championed Greek classical music and has premiered a wide range of works. It has been noted that he has been the greatest force behind the recent revival of Greek classical composers in recordings and in concert halls.

Early studies
Byron Fidetzis was born in Thessaloniki in 1945, He studied violoncello under Manolis Kazabakas and advanced theory under Solon Michaelides at the State Conservatory of Thessaloniki. Upon a scholarship granted by the Hellenic Foundation for State Bursaries, he moved to Vienna, where he continued with his cello studies at the Hochschule für Musik under the expert guidance of Vladimir Orloff, André Navarra and S. Benes, receiving his diploma in 1975.

Alongside his cello studies, he attended the class of Hans Swarowski in orchestra conduction from 1973 to 1977, in which year he gained his diploma at chef d’ orchestre. He has also attended seminars held by conductors Miltiades Caridis (Vienna) and Otmar Suitner (Weimar).

Musical career
Fidetzis has co-operated as a soloist and conductor with all the Greek and many foreign orchestras in various concerts throughout Greece (festivals of Athens, Corfu, Herakleion, the Demetria Festival of Thessaloniki, the Manolis Kalomiris Festival of Samos) as well as abroad (Austria, Armenia, Albania, China, Japan, Mexico, Germany, Italy, Poland, Russia, Czech Republic, Romania, Slovakia, Brazil, Bulgaria, Yugoslavia, Cyprus, Turkey).

For many years he has been co-operating with the Greek National Opera House, and from 1985 to 1992 he was permanent conductor of the House’s Orchestra.

From September 1990 to 1992 he was the chief conductor of the Ekaterinenburg State Philharmonic Orchestra of Russia, and since 1992 he has been Guest Conductor of Cappella Russia Orchestra in Moscow (the official orchestra of the Ministry of Culture in Russia).

He was also Honorary Guest Conductor of the Symphony Orchestra of Pasardjik in Bulgaria up until 1999; during the period 1999-2001 he also served as artistic director at the same orchestra.

Since 1987 he has been permanent conductor to the Athens State Orchestra and since 2000 he has been chief conductor of the Symphony Orchestra of the Municipality of Thessaloniki.

Recordings
Fidetzis has recorded:
Spyridon Samaras’s operas Rhea, La Martire, La Biondinetta (or, Historie d’Amour), Mademoiselle de Belle-Isle;
Pavlos Carrer’s operas Frossini and Despo o L’eroina di Suli;
Dimitri Mitropoulos's opera Sœur Béatrice;
All three Manolis Kalomiris’s symphonies, namely the Levendia Symphony (of Manliness), Of Simple and Good People and "Palamian" as well as the composer’s operas Anatoli (Sunrise) and Konstantinos Paleologos (The Fall of Constantinople);
Yoannis Constantinidis’s complete orchestral works; and
Nikolaos Mantzaros’s Ode to Freedom in its original, conclusive form.

He has also recorded works by such notable composers as Yorgos Sisilianos, Dimitris Dragatakis, Antiochos Evanghelatos, Demetrios Lialios, Dionysios Lavrangas, Marios Varvoglis, Petros Petridis, Emilios Riadis, Theodore Antoniou, Mikis Theodorakis, Haris Xanthoudakis, Periklis Koukos, Thodoris Zanas, and many others.
	
As for Skalkottas’s orchestral work, Fidetzis has conducted the world premiere of the Small Symphony (or Sinfonietta) in B flat major, four of the 36 Greek Dances in transcription for strings, and the independent Greek dance for orchestra in C minor.

In 1990 he did the world premiere recording of the symphonic cycle of the 36 Greek dances. In January the 28th 1997 he conducted the Athens State Orchestra in the public world premiere of the whole cycle in Thessaloniki. For all the above he had to restore the musical texts, considering all of the composer’s accessible scores. He has also corrected masses of mistakes in printed scores and in scores recorded in PC. In 2020, he also released an album of music by composer Vasily Kalafati on Naxos.

Awards and honors
In 1975, the Athens Academy presented him with the Spyros Motsenigos Music Award; he has also received awards by the Bank of Greece and the International Fair of Thessaloniki.

The Greek Composers Association has duly acknowledged his contribution to Greek music, unanimously electing him Honorary Member in 1986. Byron Fidetzis has also received distinctions by the Union of Drama and Music Greek Critics for his recording output.

In 2010, the Department of Music Studies of the National and Kapodistrian University of Athens presented him with an Honorary Doctorate.

References 
 Ζακυθηνός, Αλέξης [Zakythinos, Alexis], Δισκογραφία ελληνικής κλασικής μουσικής, Athens-Janina, Dodoni (Δωδώνη), 1993.

External links
 Official website Athens State Orchestra
 Fidetzis conducting Kalomiris in Athens

Greek cellists
Greek conductors (music)
Living people
Musicians from Thessaloniki
20th-century Greek musicians
20th-century conductors (music)
21st-century Greek musicians
University of Music and Performing Arts Vienna alumni
21st-century conductors (music)
Year of birth missing (living people)
20th-century cellists
21st-century cellists